"The Bath Item Gift Hypothesis" is an episode of the  American comedy television series The Big Bang Theory. It first aired on CBS in the United States on December 15, 2008. It is the eleventh episode of the second season of the series and the twenty ninth episode overall.

Plot
Leonard (Johnny Galecki) assists award winning scientist David Underhill (Michael Trucco) with his research. Leonard is overjoyed to be helping Underhill but becomes jealous when the handsome scientist starts dating Penny. This quickly ends in a break up when Penny discovers nude photos of his wife on his phone. Leonard only learns of this when he comes to Penny's apartment to confront her about their own on-off relationship. When he realises his mistake, he and Penny cuddle to comfort each other.

Sheldon (Jim Parsons) who disdains Christmas as a pagan ritual is disconcerted when Penny (Kaley Cuoco) brings him a Christmas gift. He now feels obligated to buy her a gift  that matches the value of her gift to him, and enlists Wolowitz (Simon Helberg) and Koothrappali (Kunal Nayyar) to help him with this task which they reluctantly agree to. After deciding on a basket of bath items he discovers a large selection, so not knowing what Penny will get him, he buys the entire range to cover all contingencies. Penny's gift to Sheldon is a napkin both autographed and used by Leonard Nimoy. Sheldon, overwhelmed since he now possesses Nimoy's DNA and can grow his own Leonard Nimoy, gives Penny all the gift baskets and also a rare "Sheldon" hug.

Reception
The episode received largely positive reviews. Donna Bowman of The A.V. Club said "I wasn't feeling this episode until the epilogue — and then it became so wonderful that it almost spilled over into acts one through three".

IGN's James Chamberlain called the entire episode good, while calling the end "golden", saying "...the end was nearly perfect."

TV Critic called it the best episode of the season, praising the episode for "Combining character development and humour in a blend which this show can do really well."

In 2019, The Herald-Dispatch ranked it the best Christmas TV episode of all time.

References 

The Big Bang Theory episodes
2008 American television episodes